= National Recreation Database =

Database of Canadian parks and recreation-related information

The National Recreation Database (NRDB) is an online database of Canadian parks and recreation-related information maintained by the Leisure Information Network (LIN), a national non-profit organization with the prime intent of establishing a repository for unpublished “grey” literature contributed by the recreation profession.

The National Research Database makes accessible previously unpublished, sector-related literature and tools to encourage knowledge sharing and development amongst Canadian recreation and leisure practitioners. The repository also serves as an awareness and promotional tool for sharing news and trends in the sector. It is endorsed by the Interprovincial Sport and Recreation Council (the body of federal/provincial/territorial government ministers responsible for recreation, sport and active living).

The NRDB is continuously growing, currently containing 10,000+ documents, with an additional 8,300+ records (program success stories, news, events, job postings, etc.) solicited from recreation, parks, health-promotion and quality of life organizations across the country. Not a typical database, in addition to housing resources it generates the content on virtually every page of the LIN website, specialized RSS feeds for subscribers, and customized content to other partner websites.

The Database is visited by more than 65,000 unique users annually, who download resources valued at over $3.6M including:

- Policies and Procedures
- Training Manuals
- Reports
- Conference Presentations
- Sample RFPs
- Sample Job Descriptions
- Toolkits
- Surveys
- Industry Standards

It is intended that users will contribute as well as retrieve relevant information from the database. Information is available for download at no cost to the user with proper citation.
